Jarema is a surname. Notable people with the surname include:

Maria Jarema (1908–1958), Polish painter, sculptor, scenographer, and actress
Stephen J. Jarema ( 1905–1988), American lawyer and politician

See also
 
 Yarema

Polish-language surnames
Ukrainian-language surnames